Edward L. Cash (December 26, 1849 – May 31, 1922) was a Canadian physician and politician.

Born in Markham, Canada West, the son of David Cash and Elizebeth Eckardt, Cash received his M.D. from the Victoria University in Cobourg, Ontario in 1871. From 1871 to 1896, he resided in United States and was elected County Clerk and Clerk of the District Court for Rock in Nebraska. In 1897, he started practicing medicine in Yorkton, Saskatchewan. Cash was a founder of the Yorkton Club, an elite social club created on April 3, 1907 under the Yorkton Club Act 1907.

He was first elected to the House of Commons of Canada in 1904 for the electoral district of Mackenzie. A Liberal, he was re-elected in 1908 and 1911.

References
 
 The Canadian Parliament; biographical sketches and photo-engravures of the senators and members of the House of Commons of Canada. Being the tenth Parliament, elected November 3, 1904
 Yorkton Club Act 1907

1849 births
1922 deaths
Liberal Party of Canada MPs
Members of the House of Commons of Canada from the Northwest Territories
Members of the House of Commons of Canada from Saskatchewan